Attipate Krishnaswami Ramanujan (16 March 1929 – 13 July 1993) was an Indian poet and scholar of Indian literature and Linguistics. Ramanujan was also a professor of Linguistics at University of Chicago.

Ramanujan was a poet, scholar, Linguist, philologist, folklorist, translator, and playwright. His academic research ranged across five languages: English, Tamil, Kannada, Telugu, and Sanskrit. He published works on both classical and modern variants of this literature and argued strongly for giving local, non-standard dialects their due. Though he wrote widely and in a number of genres, Ramanujan's poems are remembered as enigmatic works of startling originality, sophistication and moving artistry. He was awarded the Sahitya Akademi Award posthumously in 1999 for The Collected Poems.

Biography

Childhood
Ramanujan was born in Mysore City on 16 March 1929. His father, Attipat Asuri Krishnaswami, an astronomer and professor of mathematics at Mysore University, was known for his interest in English, Kannada and Sanskrit languages. His mother was a homemaker.

Education

Ramanujan was educated at Marimallappa's High School, Mysore, and at the Maharaja College of Mysore. In college, Ramanujan majored in science in his freshman year, but his father persuaded him to change his major from science to English.  Later, Ramanujan became a Fellow of Deccan College, Pune in 1958–59 and a Fulbright Scholar at Indiana University in 1959–62. He was educated in English at the University of Mysore and received his PhD in Linguistics from Indiana University.

Career
Ramanujan worked as a lecturer of English at Quilon and Belgaum; he later taught at The Maharaja Sayajirao University in Baroda for about eight years. In 1962, he joined the University of Chicago as an assistant professor. He was affiliated with the university throughout his career, teaching in several departments. He taught at other US universities as well, including Harvard University, University of Wisconsin, University of Michigan, University of California at Berkeley, and Carleton College. At the University of Chicago, Ramanujan was instrumental in shaping the South Asian Studies program. He worked in the departments of South Asian Languages and Civilizations, Linguistics, and with the Committee on Social Thought.

In 1976, the Government of India awarded him the Padma Shri, and in 1983, he was given the MacArthur Prize Fellowship (Shulman, 1994). In 1983, he was appointed the William E. Colvin Professor in the Departments of South Asian Languages and Civilizations, of Linguistics, and in the Committee on Social Thought at the University of Chicago. That same year, he received a MacArthur Fellowship. As an Indo-American writer, Ramanujan had the experience of the native as well as foreign milieu. His poems such as the "Conventions of Despair" reflected his views on the cultures and conventions of the east and west.

A. K. Ramanujan died in Chicago on 13 July 1993 as result of an adverse reaction to anaesthesia during preparation for surgery.

Contributions to Indian studies
A. K. Ramanujan's theoretical and aesthetic contributions span several disciplinary areas. In his cultural essays such as "Is There an Indian Way of Thinking?" (1990), he explains cultural ideologies and behavioral manifestations thereof in terms of an Indian psychology he calls "context-sensitive" thinking. In his work in folklore studies, Ramanujan highlights the inter-textuality of the Indian oral and written literary tradition. His essay "Where Mirrors Are Windows: Toward an Anthology of Reflections" (1989), and his commentaries in The Interior Landscape: Love Poems from a Classical Tamil Anthology (1967) and Folktales from India, Oral Tales from Twenty Indian Languages (1991) are good examples of his work in Indian folklore studies.

Controversy regarding his essay
His 1991 essay "Three Hundred Ramayanas: Five Examples and Three Thoughts on Translation" courted controversy over its inclusion in the B.A. in History syllabus of the University of Delhi in 2006. In this essay, he wrote of the existence of many versions of Ramayana and a few versions that portrayed Rama and Sita as siblings, which contradicts the popular versions of the Ramayana, such as those by Valmiki and Tulsidas.

The comments written by A K Ramanujan were found to be derogatory by some Hindus and some of them decided to go to court for removal of the text from the Delhi University curriculum. ABVP, a nationalist student organisation, opposed its inclusion in the syllabus, saying it hurt the majority Hindu sentiment, who viewed Rama and Sita as incarnations of gods and who were husband and wife. They demanded the essay be removed from the syllabus. In 2008, the Delhi High Court directed Delhi University to convene a committee to decide on the essay's inclusion.  A four-member committee subsequently gave its 3-1 verdict in favor of its inclusion in the syllabus.

The academic council, however, ignored the committee's recommendation and voted to scrap the essay from its syllabus in Oct 2011. This led to protests by many historians and intellectuals, accusing Delhi University of succumbing to the diktat ("views") of non-historians.

Selected publications 
His works include translations from Old Tamil and Old Kannada, such as:

Translations and Studies of Literature

The Interior Landscape: Love Poems from a Classical Tamil Anthology, 1967
Speaking of Siva, Penguin. 1973. .
The Literatures of India. Edited with Edwin Gerow. Chicago: University of Chicago Press, 1974
Hymns for the Drowning, 1981
Poems of Love and War. New York: Columbia University Press, 1985
Folktales from India, Oral Tales from Twenty Indian Languages, 1991
Is There an Indian Way of Thinking? in  India Through Hindu Categories, edited by McKim Marriott, 1990
When God Is a Customer: Telugu Courtesan Songs by Ksetrayya and Others (with Velcheru Narayana Rao and David Shulman), 1994
A Flowering Tree and Other Oral Tales from India, 1997

Essays
 Three Hundred Ramayanas: Five Examples and Three Thoughts on Translation
Collected Essays of A. K. Ramanujan
"A Flowering Tree: A Women's Tale". In: Syllables of Sky: Studies in South Indian Civilization. Oxford University Press, 1995. pp. 20-42. . (posthumous article)

Poetry

The Striders. London: Oxford University Press, 1966
Relations. London, New York: Oxford University Press, 1971
Selected Poems. New Delhi: Oxford University Press, 1976
Second Sight. New York: Oxford University Press, 
The Collected Poems. New Delhi: Oxford University Press, 1997

Appearances in the following poetry Anthologies
 Ten Twentieth-Century Indian Poets (1976) ed. by R. Parthasarathy and published by Oxford University Press, New Delhi
 The Oxford India Anthology of Twelve Modern Indian Poets (1992) ed. by Arvind Krishna Mehrotra and published by Oxford University Press, New Delhi
 The Golden Treasure of Writers Workshop Poetry (2008) ed. by Rubana Huq and published by Writers Workshop, Calcutta

Kannada
Samskara. (translation of U R Ananthamurthy's Kannada novel)  Delhi: Oxford University Press, 1976
Hokkulalli Huvilla (translated to English - "No Flower in the Navel"). Dharwad, 1969
Mattu Itara Padyagalu (translated to English - "And Other Poems"). Dharwad, 1977
Kuntobille (translated to English - "Hopscotch")
Mattobbana Atma Charitre (translated to English - "Yet Another Man's Autobiography")
Haladi Meenu (Kannada Translation of Shouri's English Novel)
A. K. Ramanujan Samagra (Complete Works of A. K. Ramanujan in Kannada)
A. K. Ramanujan Avara Aayda Kavitegalu 
A. K. Ramanujan Avara Aayda Barahagalu

See also
 List of translators into English

References

Further reading
 Guillermo Rodriguez, When Mirrors are Windows: A View of AK Ramanujan’s Poetics  ( OUP, 2016)

External links
 A. K. Ramanujan at Nationalencyklopedin
 A. K. Ramanujan at Poetry Foundation
 A. K. Ramanujan at Penguin India
 

1929 births
1993 deaths
Recipients of the Padma Shri in literature & education
University of Chicago faculty
English-language poets from India
Writers from Mysore
MacArthur Fellows
American people of Kannada descent
American dramatists and playwrights of Indian descent
Kannada-language writers
Kannada people
Academic staff of Maharaja Sayajirao University of Baroda
20th-century Indian translators
Translators from Tamil
Tamil–English translators
Translators from Kannada
Indologists
Indian folklorists
Scholars from Mysore
20th-century Indian linguists
University of Mysore alumni
Indiana University alumni
Indian emigrants to the United States
Recipients of the Sahitya Akademi Award in English
Maharaja's College, Mysore alumni
20th-century American dramatists and playwrights
20th-century Indian poets
Poets from Karnataka
American male writers of Indian descent
Indian male poets
American male poets
Indian philologists
20th-century American male writers
20th-century philologists